Dinogetia was a fort in the Roman province of Moesia.

See also
List of castra

Notes

External links
Roman castra from Romania - Google Maps / Earth 

Roman legionary fortresses in Romania
Roman fortifications in Moesia Inferior
History of Dobruja
Historic monuments in Tulcea County

ro:Castrul roman Dinogetia